The 2015 Poole Borough Council election took place on 7 May 2015 to elect members of Poole Borough Council in England. This was on the same day as other local elections and the Parliamentary General Election.

Election result summary

|}

Election results by ward
An asterisk indicates an incumbent seeking re-election.

Alderney

Councillor Russell Trent was elected as a Conservative but subsequently resigned from the party and is now an Independent.

Branksome East

Branksome West

Broadstone

Canford Cliffs

Canford Heath East

Canford Heath West

Creekmoor

Hamworthy East

Hamworthy West

Merley and Bearwood

Newtown

Councillor Graham Wilson represented Newtown for the Liberal Democrats before crossing the floor to join the Conservatives. Councillor Lindsay Wilson had represented Alderney for the Liberal Democrats until joining the Conservatives.

Oakdale

Parkstone

Penn Hill

Poole Town

By-elections 2015-2019

Broadstone By-Election 13 October 2016

The election was called after Joanne Tomlin resigned as a Councillor due to personal issues.

References

2015 English local elections
May 2015 events in the United Kingdom
2015
2010s in Dorset